Dennis Hong is a Korean American mechanical engineer and roboticist.

Career 
Hong is a professor at the University of California, Los Angeles. Hong is also founder of RoMeLa (Robotics & Mechanisms Laboratory).

Awards and nominations
 2007 NSF (National Science Foundation) CAREER Award
 2007 DARPA Urban Challenge, 3rd Place 
 2009 Popular Science Brilliant 10
 2009 Ralph R. Teetor Educational Award
 2009 Forward Under 40 honoree by the University of Wisconsin–Madison Alumni Association
 2011 “Louis Vuitton Cup” Best Humanoid Award
 2015 Gilbreth Lectureship, NAE (National Academy of Engineering)
 2015 Hyupsung Social Contribution Award

References

External links
 RoMeLa

American mechanical engineers
American roboticists
Engineers from California
UCLA Henry Samueli School of Engineering and Applied Science faculty
Purdue University College of Engineering alumni
University of Wisconsin–Madison College of Engineering alumni
Seoul High School alumni
1971 births
Living people
People from Los Angeles
People from Seoul
American people of South Korean descent